Golden Casket is the public limited lottery corporation in Queensland, Australia trading on the Australian Stock Exchange. It sells lottery tickets and Instant Scratch-Its (scratchcards) through newsagents and other convenience stores. Lottery draws are televised on Channel Seven four nights a week.

The drawing of the first Golden Casket in 1917 by Queensland Patriotic Fund was to raise money to support veterans of World War I. The operation was soon taken over by the Queensland Government. In 1938, the casket paid for the construction of the new Royal Brisbane Women's Hospital.

In April 2007 the Queensland Government sold Golden Casket to gambling company Tattersall's Limited for $530 million, with the proceeds going to the Royal Children's Hospital. The government will retain ownership of the Queensland asset, receive the $150 million held in reserves and continue to receive lottery taxes.

On 1 June 2016 the Golden Casket brand became one of the four Tatts Group, now The Lottery Corporation, jurisdictional brands to be incorporated into a national lottery brand called ‘The Lott’. The other brands being Tatts Lottery, NSW Lotteries and South Australian Lotteries.

Cultural references
Winning the Golden Casket is a major event in Neville Shute's novel A Town Like Alice.

See also

Lotteries in Australia

References

External links
 Golden Casket Lottery Corporation
 The Lott

Lotteries in Australia
Companies based in Queensland